This is a list of French television related events from 2003.

Events
27 March - The French version of Pop Idol debuts on M6.
10 July - Jonatan Cerrada wins the first series of À la Recherche de la Nouvelle Star.
20 December - Élodie Frégé wins the third series of Star Academy.

Debuts
27 March - Nouvelle Star (2003-2010, 2012–present)
3 September - Code Lyoko (2003-2007)

Television shows

1940s
Le Jour du Seigneur (1949–present)

1950s
Présence protestante (1955-)

1970s
30 millions d'amis (1976-2016)

1990s
Sous le soleil (1996-2008)

2000s
Star Academy (2001-2008, 2012-2013)

Ending this year

Births

Deaths

See also
2003 in France